In the United States, radio listenership is gauged by Nielsen and others for both commercial radio and public radio. Nielsen and similar services provide estimates by regional market and by standard daypart, but do not compile nationwide information by host. Because there are significant gaps in Nielsen's coverage in rural areas, and because there are only a few markets where the company's proprietary data can be compared against competing ratings tabulators, there is a great deal of estimation and interpolation when attempting to compile a list of the most-listened-to radio programs in the United States. In 2009, Arbitron, the American radio industry's largest audience-measurement company at the time (since subsumed into its television counterpart Nielsen), said that "the job of determining number of listeners for (any particular program or host) is too complicated, expensive and difficult for them to bother with." In contrast, because most UK radio broadcasts are distributed consistently and nationwide, the complications of measuring audiences that are present in American radio are not present for British radio.

Talkers Magazine, an American trade publication focusing on talk radio, formerly compiled a list of the most-listened-to commercial long-form talk shows in the United States, based primarily on Nielsen data.

In addition to Talkers' independent analyses, radio companies of all formats include estimates of audience in news releases. The nature of news releases allows radio companies to inflate their listener totals by obscuring the difference between listeners at any given time, cumulative listenership over a time frame, and potential audience.

Worldwide broadcasts
BBC World Service – 188 million weekly listeners, broadcasting in 32 languages as of 2009.
A State of Trance with Armin van Buuren has an estimated 40 million listeners across 84 countries.
American Top 40 with Ryan Seacrest has an estimated 20 million listeners worldwide.
Intelligence for Your Life with John Tesh has an estimated 40 million weekly listeners across the United States, Canada and United Kingdom.

Popular radio shows in the United States
The total listenership for terrestrial radio in the United States as of January 2017 was 256 million, up from 230 million in 2005. Of the 121 million listeners in markets served by portable people meters in 2021, an average of 7.5 million are listening to a radio at any given time, up slightly from 2020. 68 percent of homes have at least one radio, with the average home having 1.5 radios as of 2020, both figures being steep declines from 2008. An estimated 12% of listenership to FCC-licensed AM and FM radio stations comes from means other than the actual AM or FM signal itself, usually an Internet radio stream.

Sirius XM Radio has a base of 34.3 million subscribers . American Top 40 attracts over 20 million listeners per week. The late Rush Limbaugh's show was the number-one commercial talk show from 1987 until Limbaugh's death in February 2021. NPR's Morning Edition and All Things Considered are the two most popular news programs. Tom Kent self-estimated his listenership in 2014 at over 23 million weekly listeners over all of his network's programs, which span the classic hits, adult hits and hot adult contemporary formats. NPR has an overall listenership of 57 million listeners weekly across all shows and platforms as of 2020, with a growing proportion of that figure coming from off-air platforms.

Until the development of portable people meters, Arbitron (Nielsen's predecessor in the radio measurement business) did not have the capability to measure individual airings of a program the way Nielsen Ratings can for television, and as such, it only measures in three-month moving averages each month. Portable people meters are currently only available in the largest markets Arbitron serves. Thus, it is impossible under current survey techniques to determine the listenership of an individual event such as the Super Bowl.

For most of its existence, Talkers Magazine compiled Arbitron's data, along with other sources, to estimate the minimum weekly audiences of various commercial long-form talk radio shows; its list was updated monthly until the magazine unceremoniously dropped the feature in 2016, then resumed publication in 2017. The 2017 reintroduction also incorporates off-air distribution methods (particularly those that are Internet-based) but not satellite radio, as Talkers could not access data for that medium; as a result, the estimates for most shows increased dramatically when compared to the 2015 methodology.  NPR and APM compile Arbitron's data for its public radio shows and releases analysis through press releases.

Included is a list of the 20 most-listened-to radio shows in the United States according to weekly cumulative listenership, followed by a selection of shows of various formats that are most-listened-to within their category. (Unless otherwise noted, the Talkers "non-scientific" estimate is the source.)

Note on broadcast time: because of the effects of time on North American broadcasting, nationally syndicated shows that air live will end up on different dayparts in different time zones. The above list makes note of this. Note that although shows such as Beck's and Levin's are listed under "West Coast" drive times, that their shows are based on the East Coast (and thus air in early midday and early evening time slots there). Their dayparts are indicated as such for the purposes of clarity and consistency.

The pay service Sirius XM Radio was monitored directly by Arbitron from 2007 to early 2008. The final numbers available, from early 2008 (prior to when XM and Sirius merged) had The Howard Stern Show being the most listened-to show on either platform, with Stern's Howard 100 channel netting a "cume" of 1.2 million listeners and Howard 101 (the secondary and replay channel) netting an additional 500,000 listeners. Among formats common to both platforms (all of which have since merged into singular channels), the contemporary hit radio channels, with a combined 1.6 million listeners, ranked highest, with classic rock, hot country music, 1970s and 1980s music channels each netting approximately 1 million listeners combined. Sirius had 8.3 million total subscribers in early 2008 (the Arbitron ratings were measured against a 7-million subscriber base compared to 10 million for XM), and now has more than 30 million.  Eastlan Ratings, a service that competes with Arbitron in several markets, includes satellite radio channels in its local ratings; Howard 100 has registered above several lower-end local stations in the markets Eastlan serves, the only satellite station to do so.

Virtually all of the most-listened-to radio programs in the United States are in English. Other than English, only Spanish has an audience large enough to establish national networks; data for shows in Spanish are much more limited. Other languages (Chinese, Polish, Korean, various languages of India, and French) are broadcast only on a local level.

Past top programs in the United States
Beginning with the 1930–31 radio season, three ratings services measured radio listener totals.  The Cooperative Analysis of Broadcasting did so from 1934 to 1935.  From 1935 to 1936 and 1948–49, the bulk of radio's "golden age," C.E. Hooper monitored the numbers, which were popularly called "Hooperatings."  The A.C. Nielsen company, which continues to measure television ratings today, took over American radio's ratings beginning with the 1949–50 radio season and ending in 1955–56.  During this era, nearly all of radio's most popular programs were broadcast on one of three networks: NBC Red, NBC Blue, or CBS’ Columbia network.

The top-rated radio programs on American radio from each season:
1930–31, 1931–32:  Amos 'n' Andy
1932–33, 1933–34:  The Eddie Cantor Show
1934–35:  Fleischmann's Yeast Hour (Rudy Vallee)
1935–36:  Major Bowes Amateur Hour
1936–37:  Texaco Town (Eddie Cantor)
1937–38, 1938–39, 1939–40:  The Chase and Sanborn Hour (Edgar Bergen)
1940–41:  The Jell-O Program (Jack Benny)
1941–42:  The Chase and Sanborn Hour (Edgar Bergen)
1942–43:  The Pepsodent Show (Bob Hope)
1943–44:  Fibber McGee and Molly
1944–45:  The Pepsodent Show (Bob Hope)
1946–47:  Fibber McGee and Molly
1947–48:  The Fred Allen Show
1948–49:  Fibber McGee and Molly
1949–50:  The Lucky Strike Program (Jack Benny)
1950–51:  Lux Radio Theatre  (dramas with a rotating cast)
1951–52, 1952–53:  Amos 'n' Andy
1953–54:  People Are Funny
1954–55:  The Lucky Strike Program (Jack Benny)
1955–56:  Our Miss Brooks

At his peak in the late 1930s, commentator Charles Coughlin was renowned for his large and passionate listener base.  Because his show was not a network broadcast, but was instead syndicated on 36 stations, determining how many listeners he had has proven difficult.  Some modern estimates peg his listenership at approximately 30 million listeners. President Franklin Roosevelt's irregularly scheduled fireside chats, simulcast on all of the major networks, consistently reached over 50 percent of the listening audience during his last five years in office.

In the 1980s, the Larry King Show was the most-listened-to program in the United States, before The Rush Limbaugh Show supplanted it. During the early 1990s, Chuck Harder was Limbaugh's most prominent rival among talk shows discussing sociopolitical issues.

Though radio listenership totals collapsed dramatically in the 1950s with the advent of television, some radio programs attracted large audiences decades later, notably Howard Stern.  Before moving to satellite radio in 2006, The Howard Stern Show peaked at 20 million listeners on syndicated terrestrial radio. Unlike the above programs, Stern's radio show was broadcast daily, for 4–5 hours per day. Paul Harvey, at his peak, drew an estimated 25 million listeners to his 15-minute daily program. At his peak in the 1990s, The Rush Limbaugh Show was drawing as many as 20 million listeners a week; as of 1998, Stern, Limbaugh and then-first-place Dr. Laura Schlessinger were drawing between 17 and 18 million listeners according to Talkers estimates.

At the time of both shows' departure from Talk Radio Network in fall 2012, The Savage Nation was estimated to have an audience of 9 million listeners and The Laura Ingraham Show was estimated at 6 million listeners. The later revivals of both of those shows were much smaller, each only registering an estimated 3 million listeners as of April 2013; Savage's estimate has since rebounded. Prior to his retirement, Neal Boortz registered approximately 5.75 million listeners. The public radio series Car Talk with Click and Clack had approximately 4 million listeners immediately prior to ending its original run, ranking it among the most-listened-to weekend radio programs in the United States; individual affiliates noted that the hour of highest listenership on their stations were during Car Talk, hence why it was kept in reruns for five years afterward (Car Talk had the benefit of not usually being simulcast on multiple stations in a market at the same time as higher-ranking shows such as Morning Edition and All Things Considered often were). Talk of the Nation registered at 3.2 million listeners prior to its cancellation in 2013. Immediately prior to Blair Garner's departure from the show in July 2013, After Midnite was quoted as drawing 2.7 million listeners, the most of any country music show for which listenership estimates are made available.

Top stations in the United Kingdom
Total listenership in the United Kingdom in December 2018 was 48.401 million. All BBC programming had 33.966 million listeners, and all commercial programming had 35.577 million listeners. The figures counted listeners over the age of 15 who tuned in for at least five minutes.

Of specific programmes, the early morning Today on BBC Radio 4 has around 7 million listeners per week. Radio 1 Breakfast and BBC Radio 2's The Chris Evans Breakfast Show get 5.3 and 9 million listeners per week respectively, before the shows cancellation due to Chris Evans' move to Virgin Radio.

See also
Audience measurement
List of best-selling albums in the United States of the Nielsen SoundScan era
List of most-watched television broadcasts

References

Most-listened-to
Radio programs